Plaies et bosses is a 1974 French film directed by Yves-André Hubert.

Cast
 Paul Barge - Egan
 Isabelle Huppert - Patsy Lackan
 Françoise Lugagne - Norah
 Marc Eyraud - Dooling
 Gilette Barbier - Maeve Lackan
 Thierry Murzeau - Sean Lackan
 Jean-Pierre Mathieux - Kevin Lackan
 Martine Chevallier - Kale Lackan (as Martine Chevalier)
 Julien Verdier - O'Neill
 Georges Staquet - Coopen
 Fanny Robiane - Miss O'Brien
 Jean Rupert - Lennox
 Yves Peneau - Brian Caher
 Sacha Tarride - Le vieux malade
 Gérald Denizeau - Egoin Conglarre
 Jacqueline Johel - Miss Conglarre
 Olivier Hémon - Lisgoold
 Robert Le Béal - O'Hagan
 Andrée Champeaux - Maud Barnett
 Vernon Dobtcheff - Le père O'Donoghue

See also
 Isabelle Huppert on screen and stage

References

External links

1974 films
French television films
1970s French-language films
1970s French films